In political science, political apathy is a lack of interest or apathy towards politics. It can consist of interest apathy, voter apathy, and information apathy. It can be categorized as the indifference of an individual and a lack of interest in participating in political activities. This includes lack of interest in elections, political events, public meetings, and voting. Collective political apathy can lower voter turnout.

Political apathy is often found among younger voters, the poor, and minority groups. The Centre for Innovation, Research and Competence in the Learning Economy (CIRCLE) breaks down youths into different groups, Broadly Engaged (19%), Political Specialists (19%) and Only Voted (18%), with the rest clustered into Civically Alienated (16%), Politically Marginalized (14%) and Engaged Non-Voters (14%). In 2010, only 21% of youths eligible to vote in the United States between ages 18–21 voted or were politically active.

United States 
In the 2016 presidential election in the U.S., turnout was 54.8% while in the midterm elections of 2018 the turnout rate of 50.0% and in the midterm elections of 2014 there was a historic low of 36.7% turnout to the elections. Based on government data, in the last 60 years eligible voters that have cast a ballot has ranged from 49 to 63%. The highest turnout occurred in the 1960 election in which President John F. Kennedy was elected, while the lowest turnout occurred in 1996 with the election for President Bill Clinton.

In a Google study on "Interested Bystanders," experts discovered that 48.9% of people in America are paying attention to the political world but not voicing any opinion on the matter (non-voting, non-volunteering for campaigns etc.), thus increasing political, and voter apathy in America.

United Kingdom 
In the United Kingdom, like many other western liberal democracies, there has been a steady decline in turnout in general elections over recent decades. After a peak in the 1950 General election with 83.9% turnout in the UK steadily declining to ultimately an all time low turnout of 59.4% in the 2001 General election. Low turnout and disengagement in elections and the political process is more prevalent in younger voters. In addition to declining turnout over recent decades trust in the government has fallen also leading to disengagement.

See also
 Apolitical
 Political alienation
 Anti-politics
 Voter fatigue
 First they came ...

References

Political terminology